Michael Irwin (born 1931) is a British physician and activist.

Michael Irwin may also refer to:
 Michael Patrick Stuart Irwin (1925–2017), British-born Rhodesian ornithologist
 Michael Irwin (author) (born 1934), British author and academic
 Mike Irwin, British astronomer

See also
 Michael Irvin (born 1966), American football player